A Son of His Father is a 1925 American silent Western film directed by Victor Fleming. The screenplay, by Anthony Coldeway, was based on Harold Bell Wright's novel. The film stars Bessie Love, Warner Baxter, Raymond Hatton, and Walter McGrail. It was produced by Famous Players-Lasky Corporation and distributed by Paramount Pictures.

The film is considered lost.

Plot 

Irish immigrant Nora (Love) arrives at Big Boy Morgan's (Baxter) ranch on the Mexico–United States border to visit her brother. Holdbrook (McGrail), an arms smuggler, tries to reclaim a debt owed by Morgan's father by taking the ranch, although Morgan wants to pay him money instead. Holdbrook and Morgan both fall for Nora, who likes Morgan. Holdbrook is implicated in smuggling, and Nora and Morgan are married.

Cast

Reception 

The film received generally positive reviews.

References 
Notes

Citations

External links 

 
 
 
 Glass slide
 Stills at silenthollywood.com

1925 Western (genre) films
1925 films
1925 lost films
American black-and-white films
Films directed by Victor Fleming
Films based on American novels
Lost Western (genre) films
Lost American films
Silent American Western (genre) films
1920s American films